is a Japanese politician and the current mayor of Ishigaki.

In 2020, Nakayama passed a bill changing the name of Tonoshiro (a locale in Ishigaki) to “Tonoshiro Senkaku”, as the Senkaku Islands are a de facto part of Tonoshiro in an administrative sense. This was immediately condemned by both China and Taiwan, who also claim sovereignty over the Senkaku Islands (also known as Diaoyu Islands).

References 

Japanese politicians of Ryukyuan descent
Ryukyuan people
People from Okinawa Prefecture
1967 births
Living people